W.J.B. Greenwood Provincial Park is a non-operating recreational class park and protected area in the town of Latchford, Timiskaming District in Northeastern Ontario, Canada. It is on the southern shores of Bay Lake on the Montreal River, part of the Saint Lawrence River drainage basin, and is in the Great Lakes - St. Lawrence Forest / Boreal Forest transition zone biome. The park was established in 1985 and is named for Ben Greenwood, Ontario's first chief of the Division of Parks, 1954 to 1960.

References

External links

Provincial parks of Ontario
Protected areas of Timiskaming District
Protected areas established in 1985
1985 establishments in Ontario